The Channel Dash (Operation Cerberus) was a German naval operation during the Second World War. A  (German Navy) squadron comprising the two s, the heavy cruiser  and their escorts was evacuated from Brest in Brittany to German ports. Scharnhorst and Gneisenau had arrived in Brest on 22 March 1941 after the success of Operation Berlin in the Atlantic. More raids were planned and the ships were refitted at Brest. The ships were a threat to Allied trans-Atlantic convoys and RAF Bomber Command attacked them from 30 March 1941. Gneisenau was hit on 6 April 1941 and Scharnhorst on 24 July 1941, after dispersal to La Pallice.

The British exploited decrypts of German radio messages coded with the Enigma machine, air reconnaissance by the RAF Photographic Reconnaissance Unit (PRU) and agents in France to watch the ships and report the damage caused by the bombing. Operation Fuller, a joint Royal Navy-RAF contingency plan, was devised to counter a sortie by the German ships against Atlantic convoys, a return to German ports by circumnavigating the British Isles, or a dash up the English Channel. The RAF had sent squadrons from Bomber and Coastal commands overseas and kept torpedo bombers in Scotland ready for Tirpitz, which limited the number of aircraft available against a dash up the Channel, as did the winter weather which reduced visibility and blocked airfields with snow.

Attacks by the RAF, Fleet Air Arm, Navy and bombardments by coastal artillery were costly failures but Scharnhorst and Gneisenau were damaged by mines in the North Sea (Scharnhorst was out of action for a year). The  judged the operation a tactical success and a strategic failure because the threat to Atlantic convoys had been sacrificed for a hypothetical threat to Norway. On 23 February, Prinz Eugen was torpedoed off Norway and after being repaired, spent the rest of the war in the Baltic. Gneisenau went into dry dock and was bombed on the night of  never to sail again; Scharnhorst was sunk at the Battle of the North Cape on 26 December 1943.

Background

Port of Brest, 1940–1941

German commerce raiding against British north Atlantic convoys was made easier by the capture of Norway and France in 1940. An abortive sortie by the cruiser  ended at Brest, at the west end of the Brittany peninsula, on 27 December 1940. After five weeks of bombing by RAF Bomber Command to no effect, the ship put to sea on 1 February 1941, sank numerous ships and returned on 14 February, before sailing to Germany using the roundabout route via the Denmark Strait the next day, reaching Kiel on 28 March. The British reformed 19 Group for Coastal Command in January 1941, which kept watch on the German ships at Brest; Scharnhorst and Gneisenau arrived at the port of Brest on 22 March 1941.

British air offensive, 1941

From 10 January to mid-April 1941, Bomber Command aimed  of bombs at the ships in Brest harbour. Winston Churchill issued the Battle of the Atlantic directive on 9 March, directing the priority of the British war effort temporarily to counter the German campaign against Atlantic convoys. 1 PRU of the RAF discovered Scharnhorst and Gneisenau in port on 28 March and Bomber Command flew about  against the ships in Brest, through poor weather for the next two months. Gneisenau needed an overhaul of her engine room and entered dry dock on 4 April. When the water was pumped out of the dry dock, an unexploded bomb was found between the stocks under the ship. The ship had to be carefully refloated and removed before the bomb could be defused. Gneisenau was moored in an exposed position in the roadstead, where it was photographed by a 1 PRU Spitfire on 5 April. Bristol Beaufort torpedo bombers attacked at dawn next day; one aircraft found the harbour through the haze and torpedoed Gneisenau on the starboard side, seriously damaging the reserve command centre.

Gneisenau went back into dry dock and on the night of  it was hit four times and suffered two near misses. One of the hits did not explode but the others jammed 'B' turret and distorted the armoured deck near it, made about a third of the crew quarters uninhabitable by fire and blast damage, destroyed the kitchens and bakery and affected some gunnery control systems. Scharnhorst was not damaged but the bomb hits on the docks delayed its refit, which included a substantial overhaul of its machinery; the boiler superheater tubes had a manufacturing defect that had plagued the ship throughout Operation Berlin. Repairs had been expected to take ten weeks but delays, exacerbated by British minelaying in the vicinity, caused them to miss  (Operation Rhine Exercise). The loss of Bismarck severely limited the freedom of action of the German surface fleet, after Hitler ordered that capital ships must operate with much greater caution.

The sailing on 21 July of Scharnhorst to La Pallice, the deep-water port of La Rochelle down the French Atlantic coast, forestalled an attempt by Bomber Command to attack the ships in Brest by surprise. Scharnhorst was attacked by six Short Stirling bombers on the evening of 23 July; about six German fighters intervened and one bomber was shot down. The attack on Brest took place in daylight on 24 July, with a loss of  La Pallice was bombed again by fifteen Handley Page Halifaxes. Five bombers were shot down, five were seriously damaged and Scharnhorst was hit five times. While returning to Brest containing  of seawater, Scharnhorst was attacked by a Beaufort but shot it down before it could drop its torpedo.

At the start of the month, the Brest Group was made the Bomber Command priority again and from 11 December, bombing and minelaying took place nightly. Gneisenau was slightly damaged and dock gates were smashed, stranding Scharnhorst for a month, for a loss of six bombers. Heavy attacks continued all month and another day raid by Halifaxes was made on 30 December. Gneisenau was damaged on the evening of 6 January and 37 percent of Bomber Command sorties between 10 December and 20 January 1942 were flown against the ships at Brest.

Ultra

Ultra was the code name used by British military intelligence for signals intelligence obtained by breaking German radio and teleprinter communications, including signals encrypted by Enigma, a German electro-mechanical rotor cipher machine. The decryption was carried out at the Government Code and Cypher School (GC&CS) at Bletchley Park and the information was passed on to operational commands. From May 1941, Bletchley could read the Enigma Home Waters setting used by surface ships with few failures or interruptions, which combined with the PRU and reports from agents kept watch on the ships at Brest. By April 1941, the British knew that the three ships had been hit but not the extent of the damage. 

From 16 to 23 December, Enigma decrypts showed that the gunners of the ships were on the Baltic, conducting gunnery training. Next day, the Admiralty warned that an attempt to break out was likely. On 25 January 1942, the ships were photographed in the harbour and two short periods in dry dock by two ships were seen. From the end of January to early February, torpedo boats, minesweepers and destroyers joined the big ships; together with news that the battleship Tirpitz in Norway had moved to the south, this led the Admiralty to issue an appreciation on 2 February that the three ships were going to attempt to sail up the channel and sent the signal Executive Fuller, the order to begin the operation to prevent the German Fleet from breaking into the North Atlantic.

Norway Hypothesis

During 1941, Hitler decided that the Brest Group should return to home waters in a "surprise break through the Channel", as part of a plan to thwart a British invasion of Norway. Hitler said that the break-out should be planned with no training period, since British intelligence was bound to find out and have the ships bombed. Hitler ordered that a period of bad weather should be chosen, when the bulk of the RAF would be grounded. (vice admiral) Kurt Fricke (Chief of Staff of the  SKL, Maritime Warfare Command) opposed Hitler but was allowed only a short time to review the policy. On 12 January 1942, Raeder again opposed the channel route but planned for it, provided that Hitler took the final decision.

Hitler noted that the ships at Brest had diverted British bombing from Germany but that the advantage would end as soon as the ships were sufficiently damaged. The  refused to guarantee that the  available could protect the ships but Hitler accepted the plan. Hitler ordered that the battleship Tirpitz, already in Norway, was to be moved south to Trondheim. At a conference on 22 January, Hitler announced that all ships and U-boats should assemble for the defence of Norway and on 25 January,  Karl Dönitz (BdU, Commander of Submarines) was ordered to withdraw eight submarines to patrol off Iceland, the Faroe Islands and Scotland. Despite protests from Dönitz, another twelve U-boats were reserved for Norway, along with the surface ships being concentrated in Norwegian waters.

Prelude

Operation Cerberus

Care was taken to choose the best route to avoid British minefields and to steam at high speed. Minesweepers cleared channels through the British mines and marked with buoys (from 3 to 9 February, Bomber Command laid 98 mines in the channels). U-boats were sent for meteorological observations and several destroyers steamed westward down the Channel to Brest to strengthen the escort screen.

By 9 February, the ships had completed their trials in Brest roads and the sortie was set for 11 February. Morale of the crews was high, no sabotage had occurred at Brest and the crews went ashore freely. Among locals there was no doubt that the ships were preparing to depart and as a deception, tropical helmets were brought on board, French dock workers loaded oil barrels marked "For Use in the Tropics" and false rumours were spread around town.

Hans Jeschonnek,  chief of staff, refused to guarantee the success of Cerberus or to reinforce the fighter forces in the west. Adolf Galland was given command of the air operation, to be called  (Operation Thunderbolt). Some training units were mobilised to make up for the bulk of the  being absent in the Soviet Union. The  (signals intelligence service, General Wolfgang Martini) attempted to jam British radio-telephone frequencies by using a technique to increase atmospheric interference and reduced the performance of British coastal radars by slowly increasing their jamming. ( [Air Force General] Joachim Coeler) prepared to bomb RAF bases in south-western England and to attack British naval forces attempting to intercept the Brest Group. Fernaufklärungsgruppe 123 (Long-range Reconnaissance Wing 123) was to keep watch on both ends of the Channel and support .

Galland decided that the aircraft should fly high and low cover, the low groups flying under British coastal radar. A standing patrol of least  was to be maintained, in two formations of eight aircraft for their patrol altitudes, with each formation in two  of four aircraft. One  was to fly out to sea and one towards land in a zigzag and all  were to fly back and forth along the line of ships in wide figures of eight, in radio silence. Every sortie was timed to allow the fighters  over the ships, just enough time for relieved units to refuel, rearm and return. During , the relieving sortie arrived after only 20 minutes which meant that fighter cover for half the dash would be

Operation Fuller

In April 1941, the Royal Navy and the RAF devised Operation Fuller, a plan for combined operations against the ships in Brest should they sortie. Vice-Admiral Bertram Ramsay of the Dover Command was to be responsible for operations to confront a German squadron sailing up the Channel, with continuous co-ordinated attacks by Coastal Command, the Navy and RAF. As soon as the alarm was raised, the offensive provisions of Fuller would begin. The boats would be followed up by Fairey Swordfish torpedo-bombers with fighter escorts and by Beaufort torpedo-bombers; the coastal guns at Dover would fire for as long as the ships were in range; Bomber Command would attack any ship damaged enough to have been slowed or brought to a stop.

As the German ships moved beyond the Straits of Dover, six Harwich-based destroyers of the Nore Command would make torpedo attacks and the RAF would continue bombing and also lay mines in the paths of the ships. Of the other  half would continue operations against Germany and the rest would be preparing for operations next day. The aircraft reserved for Fuller were rotated and weather permitting,  bomb Brest. Fighter Command would escort the torpedo-bombers with fighters from 10 Group in the south-west and the  squadrons of 11 Group in the south-east. Each service arm had exchanged liaison officers at headquarters and operations rooms but did not use a common communications system.

Readiness

The preliminaries of the German manoeuvre, especially minesweeping in the Channel and the transit of destroyers to Brest, led the Admiralty to issue a forecast that a sortie into the Atlantic was improbable and that a move to sheltered waters by a dash up the Channel rather than via the Denmark Strait or into the Mediterranean to Italian ports was to be expected. Next day the Nore Command was ordered to keep six destroyers on call in the Thames and be ready to send six torpedo boats to reinforce those at Dover. Most submarines were in the Mediterranean but two training boats were sent into the Bay of Biscay. On 6 February,  the only modern submarine in home waters, was allowed to sail into Brest Roads, the commander using information supplied through Ultra on minefields, swept channels and training areas. The six operational Swordfish torpedo-bombers of 825 Squadron Fleet Air Arm [FAA] (Lieutenant-Commander Eugene Esmonde) were moved from RNAS Lee-on-Solent to RAF Manston in Kent, closer to Dover.

The RAF alerted its forces involved in Operation Fuller to indefinite readiness and on 3 February, 19 Group, Coastal Command began night reconnaissance patrols by Air to Surface Vessel Mk II (ASV) equipped Lockheed Hudsons, supposedly able to detect ships at  range. Patrol line Stopper was already being flown off Brest and Line South East from Ushant to the Isle de Bréhat and Habo from Le Havre to Boulogne began. Coastal Command had three Beaufort torpedo-bomber squadrons in Britain, 42 Squadron at RAF Leuchars in Scotland,  of 86 Squadron and 217 Squadron in Cornwall and seven 217 Squadron aircraft at Thorney Island (Portsmouth). Two days later, Enigma showed that Ciliax had joined Scharnhorst and with the recent exercises, led the Admiralty to predict an impending departure. On 8 February, in a break in the weather, PR found that the ships were still in harbour, Scharnhorst was in dock and that another two destroyers had arrived.

Air Chief Marshal Philip Joubert de la Ferté, Air Officer Commanding (AOC) Coastal Command, sent an appreciation to Fighter and Bomber commands, that a sortie could be expected any time after 10 February. Air Vice Marshal J. E. A. Baldwin, AOC Bomber Command, stood down half of its bombers and reduced the other  from four to two hours' notice, without informing the Admiralty. (The daily naval Enigma Home Waters settings for  took Bletchley Park until 15 February to break.)

Battle

Night, 11/12 February

A British agent in Brest was unable to signal that the Brest Group was departing because of German wireless jamming; Sealion, patrolling outside the harbour, had withdrawn to recharge its batteries. Patrol Stopper, near Brest, was being flown by an ASV Hudson from 224 Squadron when the Brest Group assembled outside the port at  At the patrol height of  the ASV had a range of about  but the Hudson was flying south-west as the ships turned towards Ushant and received no contact.

Line South East ran past Ushant to the vicinity of Jersey, to find a sortie from Brest which had turned up the Channel. The Brest Group crossed Line South East at  early on 12 February but the Hudson patrol was not there, having been ordered to return when its ASV failed. Joubert was short of aircraft and sent no replacement, also because Stopper had reported nothing untoward and if the Brest Group had sailed before Stopper began, it would already have passed Line South East. Habo, the third patrol line, from Cherbourg to Boulogne was conducted as usual, until a dawn fog was forecast over British airfields and the aircraft was called back at  when the Brest Group was still west of the line.

12 February

Morning

The only patrol over the Channel was the routine dawn patrol by Fighter Command from Ostend, south to the mouth of the Somme, which the Brest Group passed at  From  RAF radar operators under Squadron Leader Bill Igoe, using an un-jammed radar frequency, noticed four plots of German aircraft circling in places north of Le Havre, which at first were thought to be air-sea rescue operations.

By coincidence, two senior fighter pilots from RAF Kenley had decided to fly an intruder mission to the French coast at  while the other pilots were grounded due to the bad weather. The pair spotted two Messerschmitt Bf 109s (Bf 109) and attacked, then found themselves over a German flotilla of two big ships, a destroyer screen and an outer ring of E-boats. The Spitfires were dived on by about  fighters and escaped through anti-aircraft fire from the ships, strafed an E-boat and made off at wave-top height.

At  Bomber Command had been alerted that the Brest Group was near Dover and warned the groups to be ready. Peirse ordered general-purpose bombs to be loaded, which could only cause superficial blast damage and attacks at low altitude, in the hope that the attacks would distract the Brest Group as Coastal Command and the Navy made torpedo attacks.

Noon

(After the fall of France, Axis ships could avoid the Dover mine barrage by sailing close to the French coast.) A supercharged naval  gun could fire shells  but was difficult to use against moving targets. The South Foreland Battery of the Dover guns, with their new K-type radar set, tracked the ships of the Brest Group coming up the Channel towards Cap Gris Nez.

The gunners hoped that the radar would detect the shell splashes and allow corrections to be made, although this method had never been tried before. "Blips" on the K-set clearly showed the ships zig-zagging but not where the shells were landing. German sources state that the fleet had already passed Dover when the coastal artillery opened fire and that the shells landed well astern of the major German units. The coastal guns ceased fire when light naval forces and torpedo-bombers began to attack and by  the German ships passed beyond the effective range of the British radar.

Afternoon
The escorts of 121 Squadron and 401 Squadron were late and tried to rendezvous en route to the ships but missed them and turned back to search for the Swordfish at Manston. The Spitfires of 72 Squadron flying close escort sighted the German ships at  but were bounced by Bf 109s and FW 190s and lost contact with the Swordfish. The first section of three torpedo-bombers pressed on through the destroyer screen and Esmonde's aircraft was shot down before he could launch his torpedo. The other two aircraft continued through the German anti-aircraft barrage, dropped torpedoes and then ditched their aircraft which had been hit by flak. The second section of three Swordfish were seen to cross over the destroyer screen and disappear in the cloud and smoke. While the German fighter escorts were absent, two sections (eight aircraft) of 452 Squadron RAAF strafed several German ships and silenced the return fire of a destroyer, for a cracked perspex hood to one Spitfire.

The defective MTB fired torpedoes at the extreme range of  before returning to Dover; the rest were not able to get much closer and torpedoed through the gap between the E-boat lines, mistakenly claiming a hit on Prinz Eugen. Two motor gun boats (MGBs) arrived from Dover in time to defend the last MTB from a German Narvik-class destroyer. Two more MTBs had left Ramsgate at  but approached from too far astern of the German squadron and were unable to get into a position to attack before deteriorating weather and engine problems forced them to turn back.

Several Whirlwind fighters on a routine patrol were intercepted by the fighter screen at  The seven Beauforts at Thorney Island were closest to the Brest Group when it was sighted. Two Beauforts had been bombed up and one went unserviceable, before the other four took off at  The four Beauforts were late to meet their fighter escorts at Manston and the torpedo-bombers and fighters were ordered independently to the German ships. The position, course and speed of the Brest Group was given by voice (R/T) to the Spitfires and Morse (W/T) to the Beauforts. The torpedo-bombers failed to receive the orders, because 16 Group forgot that they had been fitted with R/T for Operation Fuller. When the Beauforts reached Manston they circled with numerous fighters which appeared to ignore them. Two Beauforts flew to the French coast, found nothing and landed at Manston where the confusion was resolved.

The 42 Squadron Beauforts from Scotland had to divert to RAF Coltishall in Norfolk because of snow but the torpedoes to be loaded were over 100 miles away at RAF North Coates in Lincolnshire and came by road too late. Nine of the aircraft had flown south with torpedoes on and took off at  leaving the other four behind to rendezvous with their fighter escorts and several Hudsons, intended to create a diversion. The Beaufort crews had been briefed that they would be escorted all the way, the fighters that they were to cover the Dover Strait in general and the aircraft circled Manston for thirty minutes, each formation under the impression that another one was leading. The Beaufort commander then set off, using the position of the Brest Group given at Coltishall and six Hudsons followed, the other five circling and waiting for the fighters, before giving up and landing at 

The Beauforts and Hudsons flew towards the Dutch coast and lost touch in the cloud and rain but the Hudsons made ASV contact and attacked the ships, two being shot down for no result. Six of the Beauforts then attacked through the flak and released their torpedoes, also with no effect. (The other three Beauforts had already attacked, possibly against British destroyers.) One bomber attacked a "big ship" but flak damage jammed the torpedo and as night fell around  the rest turned for Coltishall; two Beauforts were lost to flak or the weather.

Evening

The ships were practising gunnery off Orford Ness in the North Sea when alerted at  The destroyers sailed south to intercept the Brest Group but it steamed much faster than expected and to catch up, Pizey took the destroyers over a German minefield.

Night 12/13 and 13 February

Scharnhorst had fallen behind after hitting a mine and at  Gneisenau hit a magnetic mine off Terschelling. The mine exploded some distance from the ship, making a small hole on the starboard side and temporarily knocking a turbine out of action. When the route of the channel was more accurately plotted on 11 February, four mines were laid, then more on 12 February when the Channel Dash was on. Enigma decrypts revealed the mining of the German ships but the news was kept secret by the British to protect the source.

Aftermath

Analysis

Ciliax sent a signal to Admiral Saalwächter in Paris on 13 February,

OKM called Cerberus a tactical victory and a strategic defeat. In 2012, Ken Ford wrote that the German ships had exchanged one prison for another and that Bomber Command raids from  terminally damaged Gneisenau. Operation Fuller had failed, a British destroyer had been severely damaged and  had been lost in  fighter,  and  Command sorties. British public opinion was appalled and British prestige suffered at home and abroad. A leading article in The Times read,

In 1955, Hans Dieter Berenbrok, a former  officer, writing under the pseudonym Cajus Bekker, judged the operation a necessity and a success. He quoted Raeder "…we are all convinced we cannot leave the ships in Brest any longer". Raeder wrote that the operation was necessary because of a lack of training opportunities for the crews, lack of battle experience and the general situation made raiding operations in the "old pattern out of the question". According to Bekker, Hitler and Raeder shared the conviction that if the ships remained in Brest that they would eventually be disabled by British air raids.

Stephen Roskill, the British naval official historian, wrote in 1956 that the German verdict was accurate. Hitler had exchanged the threat to British Atlantic convoys for a defensive deployment near Norway against a threat that never materialised. Roskill wrote that the British had misjudged the time of day when the German ships would sail but this mistake was less influential than the circumstantial failures of Coastal Command reconnaissance to detect the ships which had been at sea for  four of them after dawn had broken, before the alarm was raised. Churchill ordered a Board of Enquiry (under Sir Alfred Bucknill), which criticised Coastal Command for failing to ensure that a dawn reconnaissance was flown to compensate for the problems of the night patrols off Brest and from Ushant to the Isle de Bréhat. The inquiry also held that there should have been more suspicion of the German radar jamming on the morning of 12 February and that involving Bomber Command in an operation for which it was untrained was a mistake.

The board found that the delay in detecting the German ships led to the British attacks being made piecemeal, against formidable German defensive arrangements and that the few aircraft and ships that found the group were "cut to pieces". In 2012, Ken Ford wrote that the inquiry was, perforce, a whitewash, blaming instrument failures rather than incompetence but the report was still kept secret until 1946. In 1991, John Buckley wrote that the ASV Hudsons had been forbidden to use flares off Brest, because of the presence of Sealion and that one of the technical faults to an ASV could have been repaired, had the operator carried out a fuze check properly. Joubert was criticised for complacency, in not sending replacement sorties, despite his earlier warning that the Brest Group was about to sail, because of the assumption in Operation Fuller since 6 April 1941, that a day sailing was certain,

The effectiveness of Bomber Command against moving ships was shown to be negligible and the failure to ensure unity of command before Operation Fuller began, led to piecemeal attacks using unsuitable tactics.

R. V. Jones, Assistant Director of Intelligence (Science) at the Air Ministry during the war, wrote in his memoir, that for several days, army radar stations on the south coast had been jammed. Lieutenant-Colonel Wallace, a member of the army Radar Interception Unit, had reported this through the chain of command. On 11 February, Wallace had called for Jones to assist him in bringing attention to the German radar jamming. A gradual increase in the jamming had misled most operators to its intensity. Martini had unobtrusively made the British radar cover "almost useless". Jones quoted Francis Bacon,

and included an anecdote of the chain of command breaking down under the shock of the Brest Group sailing so far up the Channel undiscovered. Air marshals were said to have sat on each other's desks, thinking of pilots they could telephone to find the ships; even after the Brest Group had been found, contact was lost several times. In 1955, Jones met Captain Giessler, the Navigating Officer on Scharnhorst, who said that the worst time in the operation was the thirty minutes that Scharnhorst was stationary, after hitting a mine just beyond Dover; in the low cloud none of the British aircraft found them. In the Official History of the Royal Canadian Air Force (1994) Brereton Greenhous et al. wrote that the Canadian 401 Squadron had been sent "to intervene in a battle between German E-boats and British MTBs"; 404 Squadron was ordered

and 411 Squadron had been ordered on an "E-boat search". "The 'Channel block' had failed ignominiously".

In the German semi-official history Germany in the Second World War (2001), Werner Rahn wrote that the operation was a tactical success but that this could not disguise the fact of a strategic withdrawal. Brest was a location from which the  had anticipated much success, especially after the Japanese entry into the war had diverted Allied resources to the Pacific, creating new opportunities for offensive action in the Atlantic. Rahn also noted that some members of the German Naval War Staff took the view that German war potential had reached its limit and that

In 2018, Craig Symonds wrote of the futility of keeping heavy units in Brest,

Scharnhorst later joined Tirpitz in Norwegian waters as a threat to Allied Arctic convoys of World War II supplying the USSR.

Casualties

The  torpedo boats Jaguar and  damaged by bombing, two sailors were killed and several men were badly wounded by bomb splinters and small-arms fire; the  lost 17 aircraft and eleven pilots. In 1996, Donald Caldwell gave 23 aircrew killed, four being fighter pilots from JG 26 and that 22  aircraft were shot down, of which seven were fighters.

Subsequent operations

Gneisenau entered a floating dry dock at Kiel and was hit twice by RAF bombers, on the night of  One bomb hit the battleship on her forecastle and penetrated the armoured deck. The explosion ignited a fire in the foremost magazine, which detonated, throwing the forward turret off its mount. The damage prompted the German Naval Staff to rebuild Gneisenau to mount the six  guns originally planned, rather than repair the ship and the damaged bow section was removed to attach a longer one. By early 1943, the ship had been sufficiently repaired to begin the conversion but after the failure of German surface forces at the Battle of the Barents Sea in December 1942, Hitler ordered the work to stop. On 23 February, Prinz Eugen was torpedoed by a British submarine off Norway and put out of action until October; then spent the rest of the war in the Baltic. On 28 March, the British raided St Nazaire in Operation Chariot and destroyed the Normandie dock, the only one in France capable of accommodating the largest German warships. Scharnhorst participated in Operation Zitronella against Spitzbergen on 8 September 1943 and was sunk at the Battle of the North Cape on 26 December.

Memorial and commemorations
A granite memorial to all Britons involved in Operation Fuller was erected in Marine Parade Gardens in Dover, to mark the 70th Anniversary Remembrance of the event in 2012. Sailors from  provided a Guard of Honour as part of the parade held to mark the unveiling.

On 10 February 2017, at the Fleet Air Arm memorial church at RNAS Yeovilton (HMS Heron), a ceremony and flypast by four Wildcat HMA2 helicopters of the current 825 Naval Air Squadron was conducted, marking the 75th anniversary of Lieutenant-Commander Esmonde and 825 Naval Air Squadron's attack.

See also
 Operation Kita

Notes

Footnotes

References

Books

Theses

Websites

Further reading
Books
 
 
 
 
 
 
 
 
 

Journals
 
 

Theses

External links

 Nafziger: Kriegsmarine Order of Battle
 Nafziger: Luftflotte 3, Order of Battle, 12 February 1942
 Obituary Lieutenant-Commander Edgar Lee 2009
 The Channel Dash Association
 Channel Dash War Memorial, Dover (2012, Panoramio)
 Asmussen, J. Scharnhorst, The History: Operation Cerberus (11–13 February 1942)
 Destroyer net, HMS Worcester
 Operations of 452 Sqn RAAF

Conflicts in 1942
Atlantic and Arctic theatres of World War II
Naval battles of World War II involving Germany
Naval battles of World War II involving the United Kingdom
Naval aviation operations and battles
February 1942 events
Germany–United Kingdom military relations
Military history of the English Channel